The Buccinidae are a very large and diverse taxonomic family of large sea snails, often known as whelks or true whelks.

The family includes more than 1500 species.

Taxonomy
The family Busyconidae was for a time treated as a subfamily of Buccinidae called Busyconinae.

Genera Antillophos, Engoniophos, Phos, Nassaria, Tomlinia, Anentome and Clea were treated within family Buccinidae, but they were moved to Nassariidae in 2016.

Habitat 
The true whelks occur worldwide in all seas from tropical oceans to the cold seas of the Arctic Ocean and the Southern Ocean. They are found from the intertidal to the bathypelagic zones. Most prefer a solid bottom, but some inhabit sandy substrates.

Description 

The shells of species in this family are moderate to large in size, conical to fusiform in shape. The shell often has deep sutures. The shell surface is generally smooth, sometimes with a spiral and/ or axial sculpture. The thickness of the shell is more pronounced in tropical shallow-water species, while the shell of species living in moderate and colder waters is generally thin or moderately thin. The top of the whorls are more or less shouldered. The radial ribs of the shell sometimes show shoulder knobs. The aperture is large with a well-defined siphonal canal. The rim of the aperture is sometimes used to pry open the shell of bivalves. The aperture is closed by a horny operculum.

The soft body is elongated and spiral. The head has two conical, depressed tentacles which bear the eyes on a lobe or prominence at their base. The mouth contains a long, cylindrical, annulated proboscis and a small tongue. The mantle forms a thin-edged flap over the branchial cavity. On the left side, it has an elongated, open canal, that emerges by a notch or groove in the shell. The two gills are elongated, unequal and pectinate (i.e. in a comb-like arrangement). The large foot is generally broad.

True whelks are carnivores and scavengers. They feed on clams, carrion, and sometimes even on detritus. Their sense of smell is very well-developed; they can sense chemical signals from their prey from a considerable distance with their osphradia. Many whelks are capable of boring through the shell of bivalves, and because of this, some species cause much harm in oyster farms. True whelks can even attack fish caught in a net by extending their probosces to  twice the length of their own bodies.

The female whelk lays spongy egg capsules with hundreds of eggs. These form round clusters or a tower-shaped masses. Only about 10% of these eggs hatch. The larvae then feed on the rest of the eggs that have not yet hatched.

The flesh of the common northern whelk, Buccinum undatum, is much appreciated by connoisseurs as a food item, but its consumption is currently somewhat in decline.

The empty shell of a whelk is often used by the hermit crab to make its home.

Taxonomy 

According to the taxonomy of the Gastropoda by Bouchet & Rocroi (2005), the family Buccinidae consists of six subfamilies:

Subfamily Buccininae Rafinesque, 1815
 tribe Ancistrolepidini Habe & Sato, 1973
 tribe Buccinini Rafinesque, 1815
 tribe Buccinulini Finlay, 1928
 tribe Colini Gray, 1857 - synonyms: Neptuneinae Stimpson, 1865; Chrysodominae Dall, 1870; Pyramimitridae Cossmann, 1901; Truncariinae Cossmann, 1901; Metajapelioninae Gorychaev, 1987
 tribe Cominellini Gray, 1857: in 2021 upgraded to family level Cominellidae
 tribe Liomesini P. Fischer, 1884 - synonym: Buccinopsidae G. O. Sars, 1878 (inv.)
 tribe Parancistrolepidini Habe, 1972 - synonym: Brevisiphoniinae Lus, 1973
 tribe Prosiphonini Powell, 1951
 tribe Volutopsiini Habe & Sato, 1973

Subfamily Beringiinae Golikov & Starobogatov, 1975

Subfamily Busyconinae* Wade, 1917 (1867) : presently, Busyconinae is treated as a synonym of the Busyconidae.

Subfamily Donovaniinae Casey, 1904 - synonym: Lachesinae L. Bellardi, 1877 (inv.)

Subfamily Neptuneinae W. Stimpson, 1865

Subfamily Siphonaliinae Finlay, 1928 - synonym: Austrosiphonidae Cotton & Godfrey, 1938

The subfamily Pisaniinae has been raised to the status of family Pisaniidae in 2009 by Galindo, L. A.; Puillandre, N.; Utge, J.; Lozouet, P.; Bouchet, P.

Genera

Genera within the family Buccinidae include:

subfamily Buccininae

tribe Ancistrolepidini
 Ancistrolepis Dall, 1895

tribe Buccinini
 Buccinum Linnaeus, 1758
 Suessionia Cossmann, 1889 †

tribe Buccinulini
 Buccinulum Deshayes, 1830

tribe Colini
 Truncaria Adams & Reeve, 1850

tribe Liomesini
 Liomesus Stimpson, 1865

tribe Parancistrolepidini
 Parancistrolepis Azuma, 1965

tribe Prosiphonini
 Prosipho Thiele, 1912

tribe Volutopsiini
 Volutopsius Mörch, 1857

Subfamily Beringiinae
 Beringius Dall, 1887

subfamily Donovaniinae

Subfamily Neptuneinae W. Stimpson, 1865
 Aulacofusus Dall, 1918
 Neptunea Röding, 1798

subfamily Siphonaliinae
 Siphonalia A. Adams, 1863

subfamily ?

 Aeneator Finlay, 1927
 Afer Conrad, 1858
 Anomacme Strebel, 1905
 Anomalosipho Dautzenberg & H. Fischer, 1912
 Antarctodomus A. Adams, 1863
 Antarctoneptunea Dell, 1972
 Antistreptus Dall, 1902
 Argeneuthria Pastorino, 2016
 Atractodon Charlesworth, 1837
 Austrofusus Kobelt, 1879
 Bartschia Rehder, 1943
 Bathyancistrolepis Habe & Ito, 1968
 Bathybuccinum Golikov & Sirenko, 1989
 Bathydomus Thiele, 1912
 Bayerius Olsson, 1971
 Beringion Habe & Ito, 1965
 † Boreokelletia Anderson, 1964
 Calliloncha Lus, 1978
 Cavineptunea Powell, 1951
 Chauvetia Monterosato, 1884
 Chlanidota Martens, 1878
 Chlanidotella Thiele 1929
 Chlanificula Powell, 1958
 Clea A. Adams, 1855
 Clinopegma Grant & Gale, 1931
 Corneobuccinum Golikov & Gulbin, 1977
 Costaria Golikov, 1977
 Crenatosipho Linse, 2002
 Drepanodontus Harasewych & Kantor, 2004
 Egotistica Marwick, 1934 
 Euthrenopsis Powell, 1929
 Euthria M. E Gray, 1850
 Euthriostoma 	Marche-Marchard & Brebion, 1977
 Falsimohnia Powell, 1951
 Fusinella Thiele, 1917
 Germonea Harasewych & Kantor, 2004
 † Golikovia Habe & Sato, 1972
 Habevolutopsius Kantor, 1983
 Harpofusus Habe & Ito, 1965
 Helicofusus Dall, 1916
 Hindsia A. Adams, 1855
 Japelion Dall, 1916
 Japeuthria Iredale, 1918
 Kelletia Fischer, 1884
 Latisipho Dall, 1916
 Limatofusus Vaught, 1989
 Lirabuccinum Vermeij, 1991
 Lussivolutopsius Kantor, 1983
 Metaphos Olsson, 1964
 Meteuthria Thiele, 1912
 Mohnia Friele in Kobelt, 1879
 Muffinbuccinum Harasewych & Kantor, 2004
 Neancistrolepis Habe & Sato, 1972
 Neoberingius 	Habe & Ito, 1965
 Neobuccinum Smith, 1877
 Neoteron Pilsbry & Lowe, 1932
 Northia Gray, 1847
 Ornatoconcha Lus, 1987
 Ovulatibuccinum Golikov & Sirenko, 1989
 Parabuccinum Harasewych, Kantor & Linse, 2000
 Paracalliloncha Lus, 1987
 Paranotoficula Kantor & Harasewych, 2008
 Pararetifusus Kosuge, 1967
 Parviphos Sarasua, 1984
 Penion Fischer, 1884
 Phaenomenella Fraussen, 2006
 Plicibuccinum Golikov & Gulbin, 1977
 Plicifusus Dall, 1902
 Probuccinum Thiele, 1912
 Proneptunea Thiele, 1912
 Pseudoliomesus Habe & Sato, 1972
 Pyrolofusus Friele, 1882
 Reticubuccinum Ito & Habe, 1980
 Savatieria Rochebrune & Mabille, 1885
 Searlesia Harmer, 1914
 Serratifusus Darragh, 1969
 Siphonofusus Kuroda & Habe, 1952
 Spikebuccinum Harasewych & Kantor, 2004
 Strebela Kantor & Harasewych, 2013
 Tacita Lus, 1971
 Tasmeuthria Iredale, 1925
 Thalassoplanes Dall, 1908
 Trajana Gardner, 1948
 Troschelia Mörch, 1876
 Volutharpa Fischer, 1856
 † Zelandiella Finlay, 1926  

Genera brought into synonymy
 Acamptochetus Cossmann, 1901: synonym ofMetula  H. Adams & A. Adams, 1853
 Adansonia Pallary, 1902: synonym of Chauvetia Monterosato, 1884
 Agassitula Olsson & Bayer, 1972: synonym of Metula  H. Adams & A. Adams, 1853
 Anomalosipho: synonym of Anomalisipho Dautzenberg & H. Fischer, 1912
 Antemetula Rehder, 1943: synonym of Metula  H. Adams & A. Adams, 1853
 Antimitra Iredale, 1917: synonym ofMetula  H. Adams & A. Adams, 1853
 Barbitonia Dall, 1916: synonym of Neptunea (Barbitonia) Dall, 1916 represented as Neptunea Röding, 1798
 Bathyclionella Kobelt, 1905: synonym of Belomitra P. Fischer, 1883
 Boreofusus G.O. Sars, 1878: synonym of Troschelia Mörch, 1876
 Brevisiphonia Lus, 1973: synonym of Thalassoplanes Dall, 1908
 Buccinopsis Jeffreys, 1867: synonym of Liomesus Stimpson, 1865
 Chauvetiella F. Nordsieck, 1968: synonym of Chauvetia Monterosato, 1884
 Chrysodomus Swainson, 1840: synonym of Neptunea Röding, 1798
 Colicryptus Iredale, 1918: synonym of Turrisipho Dautzenberg & H. Fischer, 1912
 Colubrarina Kuroda & Habe in Kuroda, Habe & Oyama, 1971: synonym of Metula  H. Adams & A. Adams, 1853
 Cryptomitra Dall, 1924: synonym of Belomitra P. Fischer, 1883
 Dellina Beu, 1970: synonym of Belomitra P. Fischer, 1883
 Donovania Bucquoy, Dautzenberg & Dollfus, 1883: synonym of Chauvetia Monterosato, 1884
 Donovaniella F. Nordsieck, 1968: synonym of Chauvetia Monterosato, 1884
 Echinosipho Kaiser, 1977: synonym of Americominella Klappenbach & Ureta, 1972
 Floritula Olsson & Bayer, 1972: synonym of Metula  H. Adams & A. Adams, 1853
 Folineaea Monterosato, 1884: synonym of Chauvetia Monterosato, 1884
 Fulgur Montfort, 1810: synonym of Busycon Röding, 1798
 Jumala Friele, 1882: synonym of Beringius Dall, 1887
 Kapala Ponder, 1982: synonym of Buccipagoda Ponder, 2010
 Lachesis Risso, 1826: synonym of Chauvetia Monterosato, 1884
 Mada Jeffreys, 1867: synonym of Buccinum Linnaeus, 1758
 Madiella Wenz, 1943: synonym of Buccinum Linnaeus, 1758
 Mala Cossmann, 1901: synonym of Buccinum Linnaeus, 1758
 Minitula Olsson & Bayer, 1972: synonym of Metula  H. Adams & A. Adams, 1853
 Morrisonella Bartsch, 1945: synonym of Belomitra P. Fischer, 1883
 Neptunia Locard, 1886: synonym of Neptunea Röding, 1798
 Nesaea Risso, 1826: synonym of Chauvetia Monterosato, 1884
 Parasipho Dautzenberg & H. Fischer, 1912: synonym of Plicifusus Dall, 1902
 Pleurobela Monterosato in Locard, 1897: synonym of Belomitra P. Fischer, 1883
 Quasisipho Petrov, 1982: synonym of Plicifusus Dall, 1902
 Sipho Mörch, 1852: synonym of Colus Röding, 1798
 Siphonorbis Mörch, 1869: synonym of Colus Röding, 1798
 Strombella Gray, 1857: synonym of Volutopsius Mörch, 1857
 Syntagma Iredale, 1918: synonym of Chauvetia Monterosato, 1884
 Tritonidea Swainson, 1840: synonym of Cantharus Röding, 1798
 Tritonium O.F. Müller, 1776: synonym of Buccinum Linnaeus, 1758
 Tritonofusus Beck, 1847: synonym of Colus Röding, 1798

References

Further reading 
 Hayashi S. (2005). "The molecular phylogeny of the Buccinidae (Caenogastropoda: Neogastropoda) as inferred from the complete mitochondrial 16S rRNA gene sequences of selected representatives". Molluscan Research 25(2): 85-98. abstract PDF
 The Seashells of New South Wales : Buccinidae
 Powell A. W. B., New Zealand Mollusca, William Collins Publishers Ltd, Auckland, New Zealand 1979 
 Glen Pownall, New Zealand Shells and Shellfish, Seven Seas Publishing Pty Ltd, Wellington, New Zealand 1979 
 Checklist of Mollusca
 OBIS
  Obis Indo-Pacific Molluscan Database : Buccinidae
 Worldwide Malacological Catalog : Buccinidae

External links 
 Miocene Gastropods and Biostratigraphy of the Kern River Area, California; United States Geological Survey Professional Paper 642 

 
Taxa named by Constantine Samuel Rafinesque